Gun Violence Archive (GVA) is an American nonprofit group with an accompanying website and social media delivery platforms which catalogs every incident of gun violence in the United States. It was founded by Michael Klein and Mark Bryant. 
Klein is the founder of Sunlight Foundation, and Bryant is a retired systems analyst.

Website
GVA maintains a database of known shootings in the United States, coming from law enforcement, media and government sources from all 50 states.

GVA's statistics, mapping, methodology and definitions are found on the organisation's website.

The website records police shooting injuries and deaths, mass shootings, individual gun related incidents, suicides, injuries, teen, child and adult related injuries and deaths.

History
GVA was established in 2013 and began in 2014 and is ongoing. It provides gun violence data and statistics. Gaps in both CIA and FBI data, as well as their lagging distribution, showed a need for near real-time data collection. (Ongoing national [US] gun debate).

GVA has a staff of professionals, with specialities from MSLS/MIS-degreed researchers and data archivists to systems architects and software engineers.

See also

 Armed violence reduction
 Crime in the United States
 Firearm death rates in the United States by state
 Gun cultures
 Gun show loophole
 Gunfire locator
 Gunshot wound
 Index of gun politics articles
 List of countries by firearm-related death rate
 Second Amendment to the United States Constitution

References

External links
 

Gun violence in the United States
Internet properties established in 2013
Online databases
Gun violence
Gun politics
Violence